Archer is a surname in the English language.

Etymology 
The name Archer is derived from the Middle English archere, and Old French archer, archier. The surname originated as an occupational name denoting an archer. By the 14th century, the mentioned Middle English and Old French words replaced the native English bowman. In North America, the surname Archer has absorbed many like-sounding names and cognates (for example, the French Archier).

People with the surname

Academics and scientists 
 Allan Frost Archer (1908–1994), American arachnologist, entomologist and malacologist
 David Archer (scientist), American computational ocean chemist
 Edward Archer (physician) (1718–1789), English doctor associated with inoculation against smallpox
 Frederick Scott Archer (1813–1857), British pioneer of photography
 Gleason Archer Sr. (1880–1966), founder of Suffolk University, Boston, Massachusetts
 John Hall Archer (1914–2004), Canadian historian, and first President of the University of Regina
 John Stuart Archer (1943–2007), Vice-Chancellor of Heriot-Watt University 1997–2006
 Kellie Archer (born 1969), American biostatistician
 L. Bruce Archer (1922–2005), British mechanical engineer and Professor of Design Research
 Leonie Archer (born 1955), British author and historian
 Margaret Archer (born 1943), British sociologist
 Mary Archer (born 1944), British solar power scientist
 Mike Archer (paleontologist) (born 1945), Australian palaeontologist
 Mildred Archer (1911–2005), English art historian
 Thomas Andrew Archer (1853–1905), English historian
 William Archer (architect) (1820–1874), botanist and architect
 William Archer (naturalist) (1830–1897), Irish naturalist and microscopist

Actors 
 Anne Archer (born 1947), American actress
 Beverly Archer (born 1948), American actress
 John Archer (actor) (1915–1999), American movie and television actor
 Melissa Archer (born 1979), American actress

Architects 
 Colin Archer (1832–1921), Scottish-born Norwegian naval architect
 John Lee Archer (1791–1852), Australian architect and engineer
 Thomas Archer (1668–1743), English Baroque architect
 William Archer (architect) (1820–1874), Australian architect, naturalist, grazier and politician

Artists 
 Aaron Archer (born 1972), American toy designer
 Dave Archer (painter) (born 1941), American reverse glass painter and sculptor
 Ernest Archer (1910–1990), British art director
 James Archer (artist) (1823–1904), Scottish painter
 Janet Archer (fl. 1873–1916), British painter
 Val Archer (born 1946), British painter

Businesspeople 
 Bill Archer (businessman), British businessman and founder of Focus DIY
 Henry Archer (1799–1863), Irish businessman, lawyer, railway pioneer and inventor
 James Archer (stock trader) (born 1974), English businessman and stockbroker
 Renato Archer (born 1984), Suriname entrepreneur

Judges 
 Glenn L. Archer Jr. (1929–2011), American judge
 Philip Edward Archer (born 1925), former Chief Justice of Ghana

Musicians, singers, and composers 
 Christopher Archer (born 1988), Australian vocalist of the band Backyard Mortuary
 Edward Archer, hip-hop performer Special Ed
 Frederic Archer (1838–1901), British, composer, conductor and organist
 Gem Archer (born 1966), English musician
 Iain Archer, Northern Irish singer-songwriter musician
 Kevin "Al" Archer (born 1958), English guitarist and songwriter
 Laurence Archer, English guitarist
 Malcolm Archer (born 1952), British composer, organist, and conductor
 Michael Eugene Archer, American singer-songwriter known as D'Angelo
 Richard Archer (born 1977), English singer/songwriter, frontman of UK band Hard-Fi
 Robyn Archer (born 1948), Australian singer and actress
 Steve Archer (born 1953), American singer-songwriter and producer
 Tasmin Archer (born 1963), English soul/pop/rock singer
 Tony Archer (musician) (born 1938), English jazz double-bassist
 Violet Archer (1913–2000), Canadian composer

Politicians 
 Andrew Archer (1659–1741), British landowner and Member of Parliament
 Albert Ernest Archer (died 1949), Canadian physician and political activist
 Archibald Archer (1820–1902), member of the Legislative Assembly of Queensland
 Brian Archer (1929–2013), Australian Liberal Party senator
 Caroline Archer (1922-1978), Australian Aboriginal activist
 Charles Archer (1861–1941), British Chief Commissioner of Baluchistan
 Dennis Archer (born 1942), American lawyer and politician
 Edward Archer (politician) (1871–1940), Australian politician
 Elise Archer (born 1971), Australian lawyer and politician
 Fred W. Archer (1859-19??), Canadian politician
 Geoffrey Francis Archer (1882–1964), British colonial administrator
 James T. Archer (1819–1859), American lawyer and politician
 John Archer (Maryland politician) (1741–1810), American congressman
 John Archer (New Zealand politician) (1865–1949), New Zealand politician
 John Archer (British politician) (1863–1932), British race and political activist
 Peter Archer, Baron Archer of Sandwell (1926–2012), British peer
 Renato Archer (1922–1996), Brazilian naval officer and politician
 Shelley Archer (born 1958), Australian Labor Party politician
 Simon Archer (antiquary) (1581–1662), English antiquary and politician
 Stevenson Archer (1786–1848), American congressman
 Stevenson Archer (1827–98) (1827–1898), American congressman, son of the above
 Thomas Archer (died 1685) (1619–1685), English soldier and politician
 Thomas Archer, 1st Baron Archer (1695–1768), English politician and nobleman
 Thomas Archer (pastoralist) (1823–1905), pioneer pastoralist and Agent General for Queensland, Australia
 William Archer (Toronto politician) (1919–2005), Canadian politician and lawyer
 William Reynolds Archer Jr. (born 1928), American politician and lawyer
 William S. Archer (1789–1855), Virginian politician

Religious figures 
 Gleason Archer Jr. (1916–2004), American theologian
 Glenn L. Archer (1906–2002), founder of the Americans United for Separation of Church and State
 James Archer (Jesuit) (1550–1620), Irish Jesuit
 Raymond LeRoy Archer (1887–1970), American bishop of the Methodist Church

Sportspeople 
 Alex Archer (1908–1979), English ice hockey player
 Alfred Archer (1871–1935), English cricketer
 Arthur Archer (1874–1940), English footballer
 Barry Archer (born 1977), Irish cricketer
 Bob Archer (1899–1982), English footballer
 Brandon Archer (born 1983), American football linebacker
 Brenda Archer (born 1942), retired Guyanese high jumper
 Carl Archer (born 1948), Trinidad and Tobagonian athlete
 Chris Archer (born 1988), American baseball player
 Dan Archer (born 1944), American football player
 David Archer (quarterback) (born 1962), American football player
 David Archer (umpire) (1931–1992), West Indian cricketer and umpire
 Dennis Archer (cricketer) (born 1963), Bermudan cricketer
 Dri Archer, football player
 Fred V. Archer (1888–1971), American college football coach
 Frederick J. Archer (1857–1886), English flat race jockey
 Garath Archer (born 1974), English rugby union footballer
 Glenn Archer (born 1973), Australian rules footballer
 George Archer (1939–2005), American golfer
 Graeme Archer (cricketer) (born 1940), English cricketer
 Graeme Archer (bowls) (born 1967), Scottish lawn bowler
 Jack Archer (sprinter) (1921–1997), English sprinter
 Jim Archer (1932–2019), American baseball pitcher
 Jimmy Archer (1883–1958), Irish-born American baseball catcher 
 Joey Archer (born 1938), American middleweight boxer
 Jofra Archer (born 1995), Barbadian born English cricketer
 John Archer (basketball) (died 1998), American basketball coach
 John Archer (footballer, born 1941), English footballer
 Johnny Archer (born 1968), American professional pool player
 Ken Archer (born 1928), Australian cricketer
 Lance Archer (born 1977), ring name of professional wrestler Lance Hoyt
 Lee Archer (footballer) (born 1972), English footballer
 Les Archer Jr. (born 1929), English motorcycle racer
 Meghan Archer (born 1987), Australian footballer
 Mike Archer (American football) (born 1953), American football coach
 Nicolas Archer (born 1955), English cricketer
 Phillip Archer (born 1972), English professional golfer
 Ralph Archer, American college football coach
 Ron Archer (1933–2007), Australian cricketer
 Simon Archer (badminton) (born 1973), English badminton player
 Tommy Archer (born 1954), American racing car driver
 Tony Archer (referee) (born 1969), Australian rugby league referee
 Troy Archer (1955–1979), American footballer

Television and film production 
 Cam Archer (born 1981), American independent filmmaker and photographer
 Dale Archer, American medical doctor and television personality
 Mark Archer (born 1973), American film producer, director and writer
 Wes Archer (born 1961), American television animation director

Writers 
 Bert Archer (born 1968), Canadian author, journalist, essayist and critic
 Catherine Archer, Canadian writer of historical romance novels
 Fred Archer (writer) (1915–1999), English farmer and author
 Geoffrey Archer (writer), British author of military thrillers
 Jeffrey Archer (born 1940), British author, former politician
 Jennifer Archer (born 1957), American author
 Jules Archer (1915–2008), American author
 Nuala Archer (born 1955), Irish-American poet
 Ruby Archer (1873–1961), American poet
 William Archer (critic) (1856–1924), Scottish critic

Others
 John Archer (magician), British comedy magician

Fictional characters 

 Major Brendan Archer, main character in the J.G. Farrell novels Troubles and The Singapore Grip.
 Cate Archer, main character in No One Lives Forever, a computer game
 Danny Archer, main character in the film Blood Diamond
 Frank Archer, a soldier in the Fullmetal Alchemist anime
 Isabel Archer, main character in the Henry James novel The Portrait of a Lady 
 Jonathan Archer, main character of the television show Star Trek: Enterprise
 Lew Archer, a private detective in a series of novels by Ross MacDonald
 Miles Archer, in the Dashiell Hammett novel The Maltese Falcon
 Nancy Archer, title character of the film Attack of the 50 Foot Woman
 Newland Archer, in the Edith Wharton novel The Age of Innocence
 Obadiah Archer, a main character in the Valiant Comics comic book series Archer & Armstrong
 Sean Archer, portrayed by John Travolta/Nicolas Cage in the movie Face/Off
 Sterling Archer, main character in the animated television series Archer
 Several related characters in the Philip K. Dick novel The Transmigration of Timothy Archer

See also
 Justice Archer (disambiguation)
 Archer (given name)

References 

English-language surnames
Occupational surnames
English-language occupational surnames